James Miller VC (4 May 1890 – 31 July 1916) was an English recipient of the Victoria Cross, the highest and most prestigious award for gallantry in the face of the enemy that can be awarded to British and Commonwealth forces.

Miller was 26 years old, and a private in the 7th Battalion, The King's Own (Royal Lancaster) Regiment, British Army during the First World War when the following deed took place on 30/31 July 1916 at Bazentin-le-Petit, France for which he was awarded the VC:

His Victoria Cross is displayed at The King's Own Royal (Lancaster) Regiment Museum, Lancaster, England. A memorial stands in Withnell churchyard in the town where he worked as a paper mill worker.

References

Monuments to Courage (David Harvey, 1999)
The Register of the Victoria Cross (This England, 1997)
VCs of the First World War - The Somme (Gerald Gliddon, 1994)

1890 births
1916 deaths
King's Own Royal Regiment soldiers
British Battle of the Somme recipients of the Victoria Cross
British military personnel killed in the Battle of the Somme
British Army personnel of World War I
People from Hoghton
British Army recipients of the Victoria Cross
Military personnel from Lancashire